Mihael Ambrož (February 14, 1808 – April 25, 1864) was a Slovenian politician. He was mayor of Ljubljana from 1861 to 1864.

References

1808 births
1864 deaths
Politicians from Ljubljana
19th-century Carniolan people
Members of the Imperial Diet (Austria)
Members of the Diet of the Duchy of Carniola
Mayors of Ljubljana